Cultripalpa is a genus of moths of the family Erebidae.

Species
 Cultripalpa lunulifera Hampson, 1926
 Cultripalpa partita Guenée, 1852

References
 Cultripalpa at Markku Savela's Lepidoptera and Some Other Life Forms
 Natural History Museum Lepidoptera genus database

Calpinae
Moth genera